Igor Revdikovich Cheminava (born 23 March 1991) is a Russian former football defender of Georgian descent.

Club career
He made his debut for the main Zenit squad on 13 March 2011 in a Russian Premier League game against FC Terek Grozny.

References

External links
  Profile at the official FC Zenit St. Petersburg website

1991 births
Footballers from Saint Petersburg
Living people
Russian footballers
Russia youth international footballers
Russia under-21 international footballers
Association football defenders
FC Zenit Saint Petersburg players
Russian Premier League players
FC Sibir Novosibirsk players
Russian expatriate footballers
Expatriate footballers in Estonia
Kuopion Palloseura players
Expatriate footballers in Finland
Meistriliiga players
JK Sillamäe Kalev players
Expatriate footballers in Armenia
FC Dynamo Saint Petersburg players
FC Vityaz Podolsk players
Russian expatriate sportspeople in Armenia
Russian expatriate sportspeople in Estonia
Russian expatriate sportspeople in Finland